Lopa may refer to:

Lopa language, a Kainji language spoken in Nigeria
Lopa County, in Imatong State, South Sudan
Baharuddin Lopa (1935–2001), Indonesian minister and attorney general
Dmytro Lopa (born 1988), Ukrainian football midfielder 
Lopa Patel, British digital entrepreneur
LoPa, common abbreviation for Finnish football club Lohjan Pallo
LOPA, Layer of Protection Analysis, a risk management technique
Lopa (fly), a genus in family Coelopidae